This article is about demographic history of Gjirokastër County, which includes the municipalities of Gjirokastër, Këlcyrë, Libohovë, Memaliaj, Përmet, Tepelenë, and Dropull.

Population

The county has 43,000 inhabitants. Gjirokastër is home to an ethnic Greek community that according to one source numbered about 4000 in 1989, although Greek spokesmen have claimed that up to 34% of the town is Greek. Gjirokastër is considered the center of the Greek community in Albania.

Greek population
Given the large Greek population in the town and surrounding area, there is a Greek consulate in the town.

In fieldwork undertaken by Greek scholar Leonidas Kallivretakis in the area during 1992, the district of Gjirokastër had 66.000 inhabitants of which 40% were Greeks, 12% Vlachs and an Orthodox Albanian population of 21%. These communities are Orthodox and collectively made up 63% of the district's Christian population. While 28% were Muslim Albanians. Overall the Greek community was the most numerous ethno-religious group (40%), while Albanians, irrespective of religious background, in 1992 were a plurality and collectively consisted 49% of the district's total population.

Gjirokastër district
Within Gjirokastër district, Greeks populate all the settlements of both former municipalities of Dropull i Sipërm and Dropull i Poshtëm and also all settlements of Pogon municipality (except the village of Selckë).

Mixed population
Gjirokastër has a mixed population consisting of Muslim Albanians, Greeks and an Orthodox Albanian population while the city in 1992 had an overall Albanian majority.

References 

Gjirokastër County